Hugh Wigan (fl. 1386–1407), of Shrewsbury and Hereford, was an English politician.

He was a Member (MP) of the Parliament of England for Shrewsbury in 1386, February 1388, September 1388, 1391, 1394, 1395, January 1397, September 1397, and for Hereford in 1401, 1406 and 1407.

References

14th-century births
15th-century deaths
English MPs 1386
English MPs February 1388
Politicians from Shrewsbury
People from Hereford
English MPs 1391
English MPs 1394
English MPs 1395
English MPs January 1397
English MPs September 1397
English MPs 1401
English MPs 1406
English MPs 1407